Benedikt Pichler (born 20 July 1997) is an Austrian professional footballer who plays as a forward for  club Holstein Kiel.

Career
Pichler was born in Salzburg, Austria, and began his youth career with local club USK Gneiss. In 2010, he joined the academy of the USK Anif. Ahead of the 2014–15 season, he moved to the amateurs of Grödig, making his debut in the Salzburger Liga in August 2014, when he was substituted for Marinko Sorda in the 58th minute on the first matchday of that season against his former side USK Anif. In the same month, he scored his first goal in the fourth division in a 4–2 victory against the Salzburger AK 1914.

In July 2016, he made his debut for Grödig's first team in the Austrian Regionalliga when he came off the bench at half-time for Julian Feiser on the first matchday of the 2016–17 season against FC Kufstein. Pichler scored his first goal in the Regionalliga in September 2016 in a 2–0 win against TSV St. Johann im Pongau.

For the 2018–19 season, he moved to the 2. Liga club Austria Klagenfurt. He made his competitive debut in July 2018, when he was in the starting eleven on the first matchday of the season against Austria Lustenau.

For the 2019–20 season, he moved to the Austrian Bundesliga club Austria Wien, where he signed a four-year contract. In two years with the Viennese, he made 43 Bundesliga appearances, in which he scored eleven goals. 

Pichler moved to 2. Bundesliga club Holstein Kiel from in August 2021, having agreed a four-year contract.

References

External links
 

Living people
1997 births
Footballers from Salzburg
Austrian footballers
Association football forwards
Austrian Regionalliga players
2. Liga (Austria) players
Austrian Football Bundesliga players
2. Bundesliga players
SV Grödig players
SK Austria Klagenfurt players
FK Austria Wien players
Holstein Kiel players
Austrian expatriate footballers
Austrian expatriate sportspeople in Germany
Expatriate footballers in Germany